The history of education in China began with the birth of the Chinese civilization. Nobles often set up educational establishments for their offspring. Establishment of the imperial examinations (advocated in the Warring States period, originated in Han, founded in Tang) was instrumental in the transition from an aristocratic to a meritocratic government. Education was also seen as a symbol of power; the educated often earned significantly greater incomes.

Shang and Zhou dynasties
The first written mention of a "school" in China appears in the oracle bones of the Shang dynasty (about 1800–1050 B.C.E.), which constitute the first written records in China and the main historical record for that period. Used for divination, questions would be written on the bones before they were placed in a fire, and then the results printed on the bones. Several of these divinations contain questions about school: ‘Is it auspicious for the children to go on school? Will it rain on their way home?’ However, the oracle bones contain little information about the function or purpose of the schools. 
By the Zhou dynasty, inscriptions from bronze vessels and the Book of Rites suggest that the Zhou kings founded schools for young aristocratic men to serve the king. The Book of Rites suggests that most of these schools were located near ponds and forests, and therefore historians infer that these schools mostly focused on martial arts education, especially archery. From the Zhou period onwards, the imperial government would have a strong influence on the education system. The traditions from this period were passed on through the Book of Rites, which later became one of the Five Classics of the Confucian Canon. During the late Autumn and Spring period, such schools had become commonplace throughout the Zhou dynasty, but the power of the central government was slowly giving way to local warlords.

The Warring States period
The Warring States period saw the rise of several influential philosophies, including Confucianism, Mohism, and Daoism. Of these philosophies, Confucianism would have the most long-term impact on state and imperial education.

The weakening of the Zhou empire and the rise of local warlords ushered in the Period of Warring States. Some local warlords may have founded academies to consolidate their power and gain legitimacy. The different schools were often organized into political entities to gain social influence. Rival scholars were invited to courts; governmental sponsorship led to the development of the first Chinese academies. Importance of education and respect to the teachers was stressed in the Annals of Lü Buwei.

One educational institution that existed during this period was the Jixia Academy. The open and tolerant atmosphere in this academy attracted Confucian and Daoist scholars from across the country for debate and study. However, the institution had no long-term impact on subsequent Chinese institutions.

Han era

Emperor Wu of Han favored Confucianism and made it as the national educational doctrine. In 124 BC, The Origins of Statecraft in China was set up to turn out civil servant for the state, which taught the Five Classics of Confucianism. The traditional Chinese attitude towards education followed Mencius's advice that "Those who labor with their minds govern others; those who labor with their strength are governed by others."

The Sui and Tang dynasty
In the Sui dynasty (581–619), the imperial examination system was established to train and recruit Confucian scholar-officials. Especially in the Song dynasty (960–1279), the imperial examination become the most fundamental and important ancient Chinese political and educational system. The function of professional bureaucracy in ancient China Higher education served the imperial examination system.

Medieval period
Imperial examination began at 605, which required the competitors to pass their local cutting score before the final examination in the capital. So the private school prevailed. White Deer Grotto Academy and Donglin Academy were their models. Meanwhile, the art school Pear Garden appeared in early 8th century, and in 1178 a national military school was set up.

The invention of paper and movable type greatly boosted the educational industry.

Qing dynasty

Education during the Qing dynasty was dominated by provincial academies, which did not charge tuition fees and gave stipends to preselected students. They were dedicated to the pursuit of independent study of the classics and literature, rather than to the preparation for governance, as was the case with imperial academies. Professors rarely lectured students, instead offering advice and critiquing research.

The near total neglect of engineering, mathematics, and other applied science education by the state contributed to a vast gap in military power between China and the European empires, as evidenced by the outcomes of the First and Second Opium Wars and the Sino–French War amongst others. In response, the Qing embarked on a self-strengthening movement, founding the Tongwen Guan in 1861, which hired foreign teachers to teach European languages, mathematics, astronomy and chemistry. After Qing was defeated by Japan during the first Sino-Japanese War, Peiyang University (or Imperial Tientsin University), the first modern university in China was established in 1895, of which the undergraduate education system was fully based on the counterpart in USA. In 1898, Peking University was founded, with a curriculum based on the Japanese system. In 1905, the imperial examinations were abolished. In 1906, American President Theodore Roosevelt passed the Boxer Indemnity Scholarship Program, which diverted overfunding of the Boxer Indemnity toward higher education inside China. Tsinghua University was founded in 1911 by its provisions.

Modern era

Republic of China

The New Culture Movement of 1919 was a reaction against the Chinese government's emphasis on technical knowledge, and resulted in a new enthusiasm for theoretical knowledge, but with a focus on Western philosophy rather than Confucianism. Education was mostly decentralized in this period, since China was politically disunited, with Chinese warlords and foreign imperialists, especially the Japanese, occupying significant chunks of Chinese territory.

Internal Migration in Communist China was almost nonexistent due to policies put in place by the previous communist government pre 1978. Those pressing policies limited the amount of education that was limited to citizens due to lack of funding, specifically women as mentioned previously, and the type of employment that was available to them, which in most cases indicated factory work that only offered harsh working environments with little pay and to add to the negativity, the salary that the employees were receiving was not even close to being able to afford medical expenses and many of the "popular" organizations did not offer any type of health care for their employees. Regardless of the difficulties China met, several universities were recognized for keeping academic and education excellence during this time period. The so-called Famous four universities were especially well documented during war period, namely the National Central University, the Wuhan University, the Zhejiang University, and the National Southwestern Associated University.

After the Kuomintang's defeat in 1949, the government had retreated to Taiwan. During the first 20 years of Nationalist rule, mandatory schooling consisted of six years of primary school education, which was also the length under Japanese rule. In 1968, the ROC government extended it to nine years.

People's Republic of China

During the Chinese Civil War, the Chinese Communist Party improved education in areas it controlled. It opened schools for adults and children (both male and female) in which locally produced textbooks were used and led literacy campaigns. These efforts marked the first time in Chinese history that peasants had educational opportunities. During the Mao era, education for all and literacy campaigns were major focuses.

After the success of the Chinese Communist Revolution in 1949, the CCP brought the educational system under national control. Improving population-wide literacy was the focus of education in the early years of the People's Republic of China. In 1949, the literacy rate was only between 20 and 40%. The CCP government focused on improving literacy through both formal schooling and literacy campaigns. In the first sixteen years of the PRC, elementary school enrollment tripled, secondary school enrollment increased by a factor of 8.5, and college enrollment more than quadrupled. By 1979, participation by Chinese youth in primary school was nearly universal.

They condemned excessive study of the humanities and social sciences, considering them wasteful and deleterious to China's industrialization. The Chinese Academy of Sciences was set up the year the CCP came into power. Education was reformed following the Soviet model, and small engineering departments were amalgamated into giant polytechnic institutes such as Tsinghua University and Tianjin University. Education became highly specialized, with students studying subjects like "railway bridge construction".

In the late 1950s, language reform by way of simplified Chinese characters were introduced into schools, as well as in publications like newspapers. This language reform was intended to make reading easier and thereby increase literacy.

In the 1960s, Mao Zedong viewed the Chinese education system as hampered by a formalism that wasted young people's talents. By 1964, he argued that school curricula, which had been copied closely from the Soviet model of the 1950s, should be reformed. Mao proposed reducing the number of school years so that teaching could be combined with activities in fields like agriculture, industry, military service, and politics. Mao argued that these changes would overcome the limits of specialization and established social hierarchies.

The early stages of the Cultural Revolution disrupted education. When schools re-opened in the early 1970s, the worker, peasant, soldier student was viewed as the main student constituency. Curriculum was revised with a focus on practical education and abstract learning and "bookishness" were condemned. Classroom education included only a fraction of the school day and the balance was spent in practical training.

During the Hua Guofeng era, the entrance exam system was reintroduced. Its reintroduction decreased educational opportunities for the highly motivated, but not academically prepared, peasants who had benefited from the "worker, peasant, soldier" model of the later stage of the Cultural Revolution. Rusticated youths surged to take the examinations, eager to pick up the studies they had left off during the chaotic Cultural Revolution period. This included an older generation of students resuming their studies. Vocational and practical training at the university level was greatly decreased in favor of research.

Since the 1990s the Soviet model has been largely abolished in China, with many universities expanding or merging with others to provide more comprehensive education in parallel with specialized technical training.

CCP moral education versus informal career education was another struggle within itself. Due to such communist control, continued government education wasn't an option for most. That also includes females. "Most of factory girls believed they were so poorly educated that taking a class wouldn't help." With that being said, many still decided to take night schooling along with working in factories to help better themselves. Eventually it started to become more common between workers to start changing work schedules between one another to help make the extra time needed for education. However, creating the personal time needed for such independent success was not easy. "The post socialist state has further controlled workers' self-organization and, consequently, wages to facilitate low-cost exports." Migrant workers were also highly important to this operation making up over 75%.

Islamic education 
Jingtang Jiaoyu was a form of Islamic education developed during the Ming dynasty among the Hui, centered around Mosques. The Arabic and Persian language Thirteen Classics were part of the main curriculum. In the madrassas, some Chinese Muslim literature like the Han Kitab were used for educational purposes. Liu Zhi (scholar) wrote texts to help Hui learn Arabic. Persian was the main Islamic foreign language used by Chinese Muslims, followed by Arabic.

Jingtang Jiaoyu was founded during the era of Hu Dengzhou 1522–1597. There were 5 Persian books and the Qur'an was among 8 Arabic books which made up the "Thirteen Classics" (سابقة).

The Chinese Muslim Arabic writing scholars Ma Lianyuan 馬聯元 1841–1903 was trained by Ma Fuchu 馬复初 1794–1874 in Yunnan with Ma Lianyuan writing books on law 'Umdat al-'Islām (عمدة الإسلام) شىي ش grammar book on ṣarf (صرف) called Hawā and Ma Fuchu writing a grammar book on naḥw (نحو) called Muttasiq (متسق) and Kāfiya (كافية). Šarḥ al-laṭā'if (شرح اللطائف) Liu Zhi's The Philosophy of Arabia 天方性理 (Tianfang Xingli) Arabic translation by (Muḥammad Nūr al-Ḥaqq ibn Luqmān as-Ṣīnī) (محمد نور الحق إبن لقمان الصيني), the Arabic name of Ma Lianyuan. Islamic names, du'ā' (دُعَاء), ġusl (غسل), prayers, and other ceremonies were taught in the Miscellaneous studies (Zaxue) 雜學 while 'āyāt (آيات) from the Qur'an were taught in the Xatm al-Qur'an (ختم القرآن) (Haiting). Ma Fuchu brought an Arabic Qasidat (Gesuide jizhu 格随德集注) poem to China.

Hui Muslim Generals like Ma Fuxiang, Ma Hongkui, and Ma Bufang funded schools or sponsored students studying abroad. Imam Hu Songshan and Ma Linyi were involved in reforming Islamic education inside China.

Muslim Kuomintang officials in the Republic of China government supported the Chengda Teachers Academy, which helped usher in a new era of Islamic education in China, promoting nationalism and Chinese language among Muslims, and fully incorporating them into the main aspects of Chinese society. The Ministry of Education provided funds to the Chinese Islamic National Salvation Federation for Chinese Muslim's education. The president of the federation was General Bai Chongxi (Pai Chung-hsi) and the vice president was Tang Kesan (Tang Ko-san). 40 Sino-Arabic primary schools were founded in Ningxia by its Governor Ma Hongkui.

Imam Wang Jingzhai studied at Al-Azhar University in Egypt along with several other Chinese Muslim students, the first Chinese students in modern times to study in the Middle East. Wang recalled his experience teaching at madrassas in the provinces of Henan (Yu), Hebei (Ji), and Shandong (Lu) which were outside of the traditional stronghold of Muslim education in northwest China, and where the living conditions were poorer and the students had a much tougher time than the northwestern students. In 1931 China sent five students to study at Al-Azhar in Egypt, among them was Muhammad Ma Jian and they were the first Chinese to study at Al-Azhar. Na Zhong, a descendant of Nasr al-Din (Yunnan) was another one of the students sent to Al-Azhar in 1931, along with Zhang Ziren, Ma Jian, and Lin Zhongming.

Hui Muslims from the Central Plains (Zhongyuan) differed in their view of women's education than Hui Muslims from the northwestern provinces, with the Hui from the Central Plains provinces like Henan having a history of women's Mosques and religious schooling for women, while Hui women in northwestern provinces were kept in the house. However, in northwestern China reformers, such as Cai Yuanpei, started bringing female education in the 1920s. In Linxia, Gansu, a secular school for Hui girls was founded by the Muslim warlord Ma Bufang, the school was named Shuada Suqin Wmen's Primary School after his wife Ma Suqin who was also involved in its founding. Hui Muslim refugees fled to northwest China from the central plains after the Japanese invasion of China, where they continued to practice women's education and build women's mosque communities, while women's education was not adopted by the local northwestern Hui Muslims and the two different communities continued to differ in this practice.

General Ma Fuxiang donated funds to promote education for Hui Muslims and help build a class of intellectuals among the Hui and promote the Hui role in developing the nation's strength.

Although religious education for children is officially forbidden by law in China, the CCP allows Hui Muslims to violate this law and have their children educated in religion and attend Mosques while the law is enforced on Uyghurs. After secondary education is completed, China then allows Hui students who are willing to embark on religious studies under an Imam. China does not enforce the law against children attending Mosques on non-Uyghurs in areas outside of Xinjiang. Since the 1980s Islamic private schools (Sino-Arabic schools (中阿學校)) have been supported and permitted by the Chinese government among Muslim areas, only specifically excluding Xinjiang from allowing these schools because of separatist sentiment there.

See also
Academies (China)
Yuelu Academy
White Deer Grotto Academy
Guozijian (Imperial Academies)
Hanlin Academy
Boxer Indemnity Scholarship Program
Imperial examination
Imperial examination in Chinese mythology
Education in the People's Republic of China

References

Citations

Bibliography

General Studies
  Suzanne Pepper, Radicalism and Education Reform in 20th-Century China: The Search for an Ideal Development Model (Cambridge; New York: Cambridge University Press, 1996). History of social and political reform using schools.
  John F. Cleverley, The Schooling of China: Tradition and Modernity in Chinese Education  (North Sydney, NSW, Australia: Allen & Unwin; 2nd, 1991)

Traditional China
  Benjamin A. Elman,Alexander Woodside, eds., Education and Society in Late Imperial China, 1600–1900 (Berkeley: University of California Press,  1994). Scholarly articles.
  Thomas H. C. Lee, Education in Traditional China: A History (Leiden; Boston: Brill, 2000) Google Books view on WorldCat .
  Evelyn Sakakida Rawski, Education and Popular Literacy in Ch'ing China (Ann Arbor: University of Michigan Press, 1979). Shows that rates of literacy in the Qing dynasty were far higher than had been thought.
 Zurndorfer, Harriet T.. 1992. “Learning, Lineages, and Locality in Late Imperial China. A Comparative Study of Education in Huichow (anhwei) and Foochow (fukien) 1600–1800. Part II”. Journal of the Economic and Social History of the Orient 35 (3). BRILL: 209–38. doi:10.2307/3632732.

Modernization and Westernization, 1860–1949
 Chaudhary, Latika, Aldo Musacchio, Steven Nafziger, and Se Yan. "Big BRICs, weak foundations: The beginning of public elementary education in Brazil, Russia, India, and China." Explorations in Economic History 49, no. 2 (2012): 221–240. online
  Hayford, Charles W. "Literacy Movements in Modern China," in Harvey Graff and Robert Arnove, ed., Literacy Movements in Historical Perspective (New York; London, 1987), 147–171
  Hayhoe, Ruth, Marianne Bastid, China's Education and the Industrialized World: Studies in Cultural Transfer (Armonk, N.Y.: M.E. Sharpe, 1987).
  Hayhoe, Ruth. Education and Modernization: The Chinese Experience (Oxford; New York: Pergamon Press; 1st, 1992)
 
  Lutz, Jessie Gregory. China and the Christian Colleges, 1850-1950 (Ithaca,: Cornell University Press, 1971). The growth and influence of thirteen colleges founded by Protestant missionaries.
  Pepper, Suzanne. Radicalism and Education Reform in 20th-Century China: The Search for an Ideal Development Model (Cambridge; New York: Cambridge University Press, 1996)
  Riordan, James and Robin Jones. Sport and Physical Education in China (London ; New York: E & FN Spon, 1999).

Educational Exchange
  Cheng Li, Bridging Minds across the Pacific: U.S.-China Educational Exchanges, 1978–2003 (Lanham, Md.: Lexington Books, 2005)
   Hongshan Li, U.S. – China Educational Exchange: State, Society, and Intercultural Relations, 1905-1950 (Piscataway: Rutgers University Press,  2007).
   Edward J.M. Rhoads, Stepping Forth into the World the Chinese Educational Mission to the United States, 1872–81. (Hong Kong: Hong Kong Univ Pr, 2011). In depth study of the Chinese Educational Mission led by Yung Wing.
Islamic

The People's Republic, 1949-
  Howard Gardner, To Open Minds: Chinese Clues to the Dilemma of Contemporary American Education (New York: Basic Books, 1989). The observations of a leading American educationist who visited China in the 1980s and ascribed the effectiveness of Chinese education to underlying cultural attitudes and political choices.
  Emily Hannum and Albert Par, eds.,. Education and Reform in China. London ; New York: Routledge, Critical Asian Scholarship,  2007. xx, 282 p.p.  Google Books view on WorldCat. Comprehensive collection of articles on finance and access under reform; schools, teachers, literacy, and educational quality under market reforms after the death of Mao in 1976.
  Shi Ming Hu Eli Seifman, eds. Toward a New World Outlook: A Documentary History of Education in the People's Republic of China, 1949–1976 (New York: AMS Press, 1976)
  Xiufang Wang. Education in China since 1976. Jefferson, N.C.: McFarland & Co.,  2003. . . Google Books view on WorldCat
  Xiulan Zhang, ed.,. China's Education Development and Policy, 1978–2008. Leiden; Boston: Brill, Social Scientific Studies in Reform Era China,  2011. xix, 480 pp.  Google Books view on WorldCat Translations of articles by specialists in the PRC on policy making; early childhood education; basic education; special education; vocational education; ethnic minority education; private education.
  Ruth Hayhoe, China's Universities and the Open Door (Armonk, N.Y.: M.E. Sharpe, 1989)
  Julia Kwong, Chinese Education in Transition: Prelude to the Cultural Revolution (Montreal: McGill-Queen's University Press, 1979)
  Heidi A. Ross, China Learns English: Language Teaching and Social Change in the People's Republic (New Haven: Yale University Press, 1993)
  Jonathan Unger, Education under Mao: Class and Competition in Canton Schools, 1960–1980 (New York: Columbia University Press, 1982)
  Jing Lin, Education in Post-Mao China (Westport, Conn.: Praeger, 1993)
Periodicals
 Chinese Education M.E. Sharpe. A journal of translations from Chinese sources.